Alberto Ferrero Gordiola (born 15 November 1944) is a former Uruguayan naturalized Chilean professional football player. He was the topscorer of the 1969 Copa Libertadores with eight goals.

Club career
After having played for Peñarol in his home country, he moved to Chile, where he stayed during the best period of his career. He joined the Santiago Wanderers and scored six goals in 13 games during the 1968 season. His best season at the local level was the 1969 National championship, during which he scored 18 goals in 35 games, being the second top goalscorer of the tournament behind Eladio Zárate (22 goals). He also scored eight goals during the 1969 Copa Libertadores, becoming the top goalgetter for that competition. His team managed to reach the quarterfinals, but failed to qualify for the semifinals. Ferrero left the Wanderers in 1971; he continued to play in Chile, appearing for Unión La Calera and Antofagasta.

References

External links

1944 births
Living people
Uruguayan footballers
Uruguayan expatriate footballers
Peñarol players
Racing Club de Montevideo players
Santiago Wanderers footballers
C.D. Antofagasta footballers
Unión La Calera footballers
Chilean Primera División players
Expatriate footballers in Chile
Uruguayan expatriate sportspeople in Chile
Place of birth missing (living people)
Association football forwards
Naturalized citizens of Chile